Utopia is an imagined community or society that possesses highly desirable or nearly perfect qualities for its citizens.

Utopia or UTOPIA may also refer to:

Arts and entertainment

Literature
 Utopia (book), the 1516 book by Thomas More that coined the term
 Utopia (German science fiction), several science fiction series published by Erich Pabel Verlag
 Utopia (Child novel), a 2002 novel by Lincoln Child
 Utopia (comics), a 2009 crossover
 Isaac Asimov's Utopia, a 1996 science fiction novel by Roger MacBride Allen
 The Utopian (comics), a webcomic and comic book

Film and television
 Utopia (1951 film), or Atoll K, a Laurel and Hardy film
 Utopia (1983 film), a German film
 Utopia (2013 film), a documentary film about Indigenous Australians
 Utopia (2015 film), an Afghan film
 Utopia (2018 film), a Peruvian drama film
 Utopia (British TV series), a 2013 British drama series
 Utopia (2020 TV series), a 2020 American adaption of the British series
 Utopia (Australian TV series), a 2014 Australian comedy series
 Utopia (Dutch TV series), a 2014 Dutch reality series
 Utopia (2014 American TV series), a 2014 American reality series based on the Dutch series
 Ütopya, a 2014–2015 Turkish reality series based on the Dutch series
 "Utopia" (Doctor Who), a 2007 episode

Music
 Utopia Records, a psychedelic trance record label
 Utopia (band), an American progressive rock group
 Utopia (Brazilian band), a rock band from Brazil
 Utopia, Limited, an 1893 Gilbert and Sullivan comic opera
 Utopia, a 1973 studio project related to Amon Düül II

Albums
 Utopia (360 album), 2014
 Utopia (Axxis album), 2009, or the title song
 Utopía (Belinda Peregrín album), 2006
 Utopia (Björk album), a 2017 album by Björk
 Utopia (Deen album), 2003 by Deen
 Utopia (Gothminister album), 2013, or the title song
 Utopía (Joan Manuel Serrat album), 1992, or the title song
 Utopia (Kerli EP), a 2013 extended play by Kerli
 Utopía (Romeo Santos album), 2019
 Utopia (Serena Ryder album), 2017
 Utopia (Travis Scott album), 2023
 Utopia (Unexpect album), 1999
 Utopia (Utopia album), 1982
 (N)utopia, a 2005 album by Graveworm, or the title song
 Utopian (album), a 2016 album by Virginia to Vegas
 Todd Rundgren's Utopia (album), 1974

Songs
 "Utopia" (Alanis Morissette song), 2002
 "Utopia" (Goldfrapp song), 2000
 "Utopia" (Tom Dice song), 2012
 "Utopia" (Within Temptation song), 2009
 "Utopia", a song by Jackson and His Computerband
 "Utopia", a song by Björk
 "Utopia", a song by Austra

Video games
 Utopia (video game), a 1981 Intellivision simulation game
 Utopia: The Creation of a Nation, a 1991 computer strategy game
 Utopia (online game), a 1998 browser strategy game

Other
 Utopia (distributor), an American film production, distribution
 Utopia FM, a radio station at the University of Sunderland, England
 Utopia (Owarai), a Japanese comedy duo

Places
 Utopia, Northern Territory, Australia
 Utopia, New Brunswick, Canada
 Utopia Planitia, a large impact crater basin on Mars
 Utopia Island (Almere), an artificial island on the Floriade 2022 expo site in the Netherlands

United States
 Utopia, West Park, Florida
 Utopia, Kansas
 Utopia, Queens, New York
 Utopia Parkway (Queens), a street in New York
 Utopia, Ohio, a former anarchistic community
 Utopia, Texas

Science and technology
 UTOPIA (bioinformatics tools)
 Utopia (typeface), a typeface by Robert Slimbach
 System Packet Interface or Utopia, an ATM protocol specification
 Utopia (insect), a genus of beetles

Internet
 Utopia (internet forum), Chinese internet forum
 Utopia (marketplace), a former darknet market
 Utopia (website), a web portal based in Bangkok, Thailand
 Utah Telecommunication Open Infrastructure Agency, a consortium of Utah cities

Transportation
 SS Utopia, a British steamship that sank in 1891 with the loss of 562 passengers and crew
 Utopia (cruise ship), a planned residential cruise ship
 Utopian (automobile), an early English automobile

Other uses
 Utopian socialism, the first currents of modern socialist thought
 Utopia University, a defunct university in Shanghai
 Utopias (beer), a beer made by Samuel Adams
  (aka Havana Nights Festival), an electronic music festival in Germany

See also
 Eutopia (disambiguation)
 Utopians (disambiguation)
 "Youtopia", song by Armin van Buuren
 Zootopia, Disney animated film featuring animals